Thạch Thất is a district (huyện) of Hanoi in the Red River Delta region of Vietnam.

Thạch Thất district is bordered by Phúc Thọ district to the east and north, Hòa Bình province to the west, Sơn Tây town and Ba Vì district to the northwest, Quốc Oai district to the south.

The district is subdivided to 23 commune-level subdivisions, including the township of Liên Quan (district capital) and the rural communes of Bình Phú, Bình Yên, Canh Nậu, Cẩm Yên, Cần Kiệm, Chàng Sơn, Dị Nậu, Đại Đồng, Đồng Trúc, Hạ Bằng, Hương Ngải, Hữu Bằng, Kim Quan, Lại Thượng, Phú Kim, Phùng Xá, Tân Xã, Thạch Hòa, Thạch Xá, Tiến Xuân, Yên Bình, Yên Trung.

Districts of Hanoi